Sam Riggs is an American country music singer-songwriter.

Biography
Sam Riggs was born in St. Cloud, Florida. He moved to Austin, Texas in August 2007 when he was 19 years old. He worked in manual labour but also performed his songs in local cafes and bars. Riggs released his first extended play, Hairpin Trigger Heart, in 2010. He met Ray Wylie Hubbard in 2011, who taught him his fingerpicking style. Riggs sold all of his possessions to finance the release of his second extended play, Lighthouse, released in 2012.

Riggs' full-length debut album, Outrun the Sun, was released on October 29, 2013 by Vision Entertainment. The album was released under the moniker Sam Riggs and the Night People. The first two singles reached the top 10 on the Texas Music Chart. The video for the single "When the Lights Go Out" peaked at number one on CMT's fan-voted Pure 12 Pack Countdown. One of the album's songs, "Collide", was featured in the TV show Nashville. The album sold over 10,000 copies and earned him Artist of the Year at the first Texas Magazine Texas Music Awards.

In February 2015, Riggs released "Second Hand Smoke", the first song from his second studio album. The album, Breathless, was released on February 19, 2016. Riggs produced the album with Eric Herbst. It was released on his own record label, Deep Creek Records, and funded by a Kickstarter project. Breathless debuted at number 12 on the Billboard Country Albums chart and number 168 on the Billboard 200, selling 3,800 copies in its first week of release. On February 1, 2019, Sam released his first single of 2019, "Obsessed" and on March 1, 2019, he released his current single, "Until My Heart Stops Beating".

Personal life
Riggs is currently married and has a son.

Discography

Albums

Extended plays

Music videos

Singles

References

External links

American country singer-songwriters
American male singer-songwriters
Country musicians from Florida
Living people
People from St. Cloud, Florida
Singer-songwriters from Florida
Musicians from Austin, Texas
Country musicians from Texas
Year of birth missing (living people)
Singer-songwriters from Texas